Benjamin Melniker (May 25, 1913 – February 26, 2018) was an American film producer and Centenarian. He was an executive producer with Michael E. Uslan on the Batman film series and other DC Comics films. Melniker was also at one time a studio executive at MGM.

Filmography

Films

Television

Shorts

References

External links

1913 births
2018 deaths
American centenarians
Men centenarians
American film producers
Place of birth missing
Metro-Goldwyn-Mayer executives
People from Bayonne, New Jersey
Television producers from New Jersey